Byakovo is a rural locality (a village) in Gorodetskoye Rural Settlement, Kichmengsko-Gorodetsky District, Vologda Oblast, Russia. The population was 41 as of 2002.

Geography 
Byakovo is located 21 km northwest of Kichmengsky Gorodok (the district's administrative centre) by road. Kichmenga is the nearest rural locality.

References 

Rural localities in Kichmengsko-Gorodetsky District